The Morgan Plus Six is a sports car produced by the British car manufacturer Morgan.

History
After the Morgan Plus 8 was discontinued in 2018, Morgan presented the successor model, the Plus Six, based on a new glued aluminum platform at the 89th Geneva Motor Show in March 2019. The body still sits on an ash wood frame, which has been significantly reinforced compared to the previous series. 

At the market launch, the roadster is available in two models - Emerald and Moonstone.

Technical characteristics
The Plus Six is based on a new bonded aluminium platform associated with a wooden frame called "CX-Generation", offering increased torsional rigidity by 100% compared to the previous aluminum platform used by other Morgan models. The wheelbase is extended by 20 mm, contributing to the 31% increase in interior space.

The Plus Six is powered by the  BMW B58 in-line six-cylinder petrol engine and is notably the first model from Morgan equipped with a turbocharger from the factory.

References

External links

Morgan Motor Company page

Plus Six
Cars introduced in 2019
Retro-style automobiles
Roadsters
Sports cars
2020s cars